Harold D. Krebs (October 2, 1937 – June 3, 2019) was a Canadian football player who played for the Edmonton Eskimos, Hamilton Tiger-Cats, Toronto Argonauts, Montreal Alouettes and Calgary Stampeders. He won the Grey Cup with the Eskimos in 1956. He played junior football previously for the Kitchener-Waterloo Dutchmen and London Lords. His son, Tom Krebs also played for the Edmonton Eskimos in the 1980s. He was later working in the real estate investment business in Calgary. In 1969, Krebs filed a lawsuit against the Stampeders, alleging that he was forced to play games while injured. He died on June 3, 2019.

References

1937 births
2019 deaths
Canadian football people from Edmonton
Players of Canadian football from Alberta
Edmonton Elks players
Hamilton Tiger-Cats players
Toronto Argonauts players
Montreal Alouettes players
Calgary Stampeders players